Diana Encinas (born 2 April 1968) is a Mexican figure skater. She competed in the ladies' singles event at the 1988 Winter Olympics.

References

External links
 

1968 births
Living people
Mexican female single skaters
Olympic figure skaters of Mexico
Figure skaters at the 1988 Winter Olympics
Place of birth missing (living people)